Gordon bobby Roberts (born 1928), better known as Gordon the Tramp, is a resident of Bournemouth who is famous for always knowing the correct time even though he does not own a watch.

He is a well known character in Bournemouth with his large beard and Manchester United scarf, which he wears to all the AFC Bournemouth games. Despite his nickname, Roberts is not actually a homeless man as he owns a house in Charminster, Bournemouth.

Roberts became an internet phenomenon when Chris Kimber, a Bournemouth University student, created a Facebook page on his behalf. As of January 2010 he has gathered an appreciative collection of 14,685 friends on this site; fans have uploaded pictures of themselves with Roberts and added stories about meeting him. The phenomenon has been widely reported in many UK newspapers and has spread as far as the Netherlands and Australia. He has also been a subject on South England's Meridian News which can be viewed on video sharing websites such as YouTube. On 13 January 2010, a Facebook group was set up proclaiming Roberts had died of a heart attack. However, it was soon discovered to be a hoax and shortly afterwards he was found alive and well in Bournemouth town centre.
As of July 2011, an online campaign was underway to have Roberts carry the Olympic torch as it passed through Bournemouth. The singer/songwriter Julian Barry who is also from Bournemouth wrote a song titled 'Gordon The Tramp' about Gordon Roberts.

References

People from Bournemouth
1928 births
Living people